The General Union of Djibouti Workers (UGTD) is a trade union centre in Djibouti. It was the official union arm of the government until 1995, when protests and conflicts separated the two. The UGTD now works closely with the UDT.

References

Trade unions in Djibouti